Nanoose Bay is a community on the east coast of southern Vancouver Island, British Columbia, Canada.

Name origin
In 1862, John Enos (Joao Ignacio) became the first European settler on the Nanoose Bay Peninsula. The bay was spelled Noonooa on an 1864 map. The current anglicized spelling was adopted by the early 1870s.

The Nanoose First Nation called the peninsula Berry Point. In the early 1800s, a rival tribe massacred many members, who were berry picking. A child survivor was later known as "Nanoose Bob".

Nanoose Bay settlement
The Nanoose Bay community was formerly called Arlington after the Arlington Hotel, the post office name from 1906, until adopting Nanoose Bay in 1916.

In 1957, Yvonne and John Ruggles opened a store on the hill in the Qualicum National Wildlife Area. The modern retail and commercial centre on Collins Cres was called the Red Gap Centre, but nowadays only the supermarket appears to bear that descriptor. A firehall, library, and elementary school exist.

Railway
Around 1910, the Nanoose Bay train station opened, and was a flag stop when Via Rail on Vancouver Island ceased in 2011. At the railway crossing on Nanoose Beach Rd, not even a signpost marked the flag stop location in its final years.

Neighbouring settlements

Along NW Bay Rd, was the community of Brynmarl (south of Sanders Rd intersection), which had a post office (1886–1935), stage stop, and train station. The Rocking Horse Pub lies among rural holdings.

In 1911, along today's Powder Point Rd, the peninsula was called "Powder Point" when the Giant Powder Company established a plant, community, and a  narrow gauge railway that connected the complex. In 1918, an explosion caused extensive damage, and the plant relocated in 1925.

Near the point, at Brickyard Cove, a brick plant existed in 1911. Clay came from the grounds of the present golf course. Bricks intertwine the roots of giant trees in Brickyard Park. At Dolphin Beach, the Fairwinds Schooner Cove Marina has 360 berths.

The ghost town of Red Gap, which was the site of the Straits Lumber Mill 1912–1942, is southeast along the highway.

Military test range
The Canadian Forces Maritime Experimental Test Range (CFMETR) is in a restricted area at the wharf terminus of Powder Point Rd. The joint Canadian-American testing facility for torpedoes and other naval warfare and listening equipment has operated since 1965. During the 1970s and 1980s, a protest camp along the highway targeted the facility.

References

External links

Unincorporated settlements in British Columbia
Populated places in the Regional District of Nanaimo
Designated places in British Columbia